Kevin Masters may refer to:

Kevin Masters (cricketer) (born 1961), English cricketer
Kevin Masters (psychologist), American psychologist
Kevin Masters (EastEnders), fictional character